Agos may refer to:
Agos, a weekly Turkish Armenian newspaper published in Istanbul, Turkey
Agos (TV series), a Filipino TV series
AGOS, the US Navy Auxiliary General Ocean Surveillance Ship

See also
 AGO (disambiguation)